Robert Michael Wilkinson (25 July 1951 – 1 February 2021) was an English rugby union player who played as a lock. Born in Luton, he attended St Albans School and the University of Cambridge, where he earned three Blues between 1971 and 1973. He played his club rugby for Bedford RFC, for whom he made more than 311 appearances in a 16-year career; he made his debut as a 17-year-old in 1969, and made his final appearance in 1985. He captained Bedford from 1976 to 1979. He also made 19 appearances for the Barbarians between 1972 and 1984, including the famous victory over New Zealand in Cardiff in 1973, scoring three tries; he served as captain for the Barbarians for matches against Cardiff RFC and Newport RFC on their Easter tour to South Wales in 1979. He earned six caps for England between May 1975 and March 1976.

Wilkinson died on 1 February 2021 after a short illness. He was survived by his wife Sally and their four sons.

References

1951 births
2021 deaths
Rugby union players from Luton
English rugby union players
Rugby union locks
Cambridge University R.U.F.C. players
Bedford Blues players
Barbarian F.C. players
England international rugby union players
People educated at St Albans School, Hertfordshire
Alumni of Emmanuel College, Cambridge